Garanin is a Russian masculine surname, its feminine counterpart is Garanina. It may refer to
Dmitry Garanin
Elena Garanina (born 1956), Russian ice dancer.
Ivan Garanin (born 1945), Russian cross-country skier
Vadim Garanin
Veronika Nikitina, born Garanina

See also
Garanin general-purpose machine guns

Russian-language surnames